The men's 200 metre butterfly event at the 1972 Olympic Games took place August 28. This swimming event used the butterfly stroke. Because an Olympic-size swimming pool is 50 metres long, this race consisted of four lengths of the pool.

Medalists

Results

Heats

Heat 1

Key: OR = Olympic record, Q = Qualified

Heat 2

Key: DQ = Disqualified, OR = Olympic record, Q = Qualified

Heat 3

Key: Q = Qualified

Heat 4

Key: OR = Olympic record, Q = Qualified

Final

Key: WR = World record

References

Men's butterfly 200 metre
Men's events at the 1972 Summer Olympics